Metriochroa argyrocelis is a moth of the family Gracillariidae. It is known from Zimbabwe.

The larvae feed on Impatiens sylvicola. They mine the leaves of their host plant. The mine has the form of an extremely long, narrow, irregularly contorted gallery on upperside of leaf.

References

Endemic fauna of Zimbabwe
Phyllocnistinae
Lepidoptera of Zimbabwe
Moths of Sub-Saharan Africa